The 2022–23 Hsinchu JKO Lioneers season was the franchise's 3rd season, its third season in the P. LEAGUE+ (PLG), its 3rd in Hsinchu County. The Lioneers are coached by Lin Kuan-Lun in his third year as head coach. On July 26, 2022, the Lioneers announced that Kenny Kao has resigned from general manager and named president Hu Lung-Chih as the new general manager.

Draft

Standings

Roster

Game log

Interleague Play

Quarterfinals

Preseason 

|-style="background:#fcc"
| 1 || October 8 || Dreamers || L 100–115 || William Artino (20) || Anthony Bennett (10) || Kao Kuo-Hao (7) || Fengshan Arena4,205 || 0–1
|-style="background:#cfc"
| 2 || October 10 || @Steelers || W 111–102 || William Artino (24) || Anthony Bennett (13) || Kao Kuo-Hao (6) || Fengshan Arena3,306 || 1–1

Regular season 

|-style="background:#fcc"
| 1 || November 5 || @Braves || L 94–102 || Sim Bhullar (28) || Sim Bhullar (17) || Tien Hao (7) || Taipei Heping Basketball Gymnasium7,000 || 0–1
|-style="background:#fcc"
| 2 || November 13 || @Kings || L 78–113 || Terrico White (22) || Sim Bhullar (14) || Terrico White (4) || Xinzhuang Gymnasium4,163 || 0–2
|-style="background:#cfc"
| 3 || November 19 || Steelers || W 89–83 || Terrico White (24) || William Artino (16) || Terrico White (7) || Hsinchu County Stadium5,238 || 1–2
|-style="background:#cfc"
| 4 || November 20 || Braves || W 108–104 (2OT) ||  Sim Bhullar (22) || Sim Bhullar (18) || Kao Kuo-Hao (6) || Hsinchu County Stadium5,612 || 2–2
|-style="background:#cfc"
| 5 || November 29 || @Steelers || W 102–101 || Sim Bhullar (29) || Sim Bhullar (15) || Tien Hao (11) || Fengshan Arena2,505 || 3–2

|-style="background:#cfc"
| 6 || December 3 || Dreamers || W 82–77 || William Artino (18) || William Artino (17) || William Artino (5) || Hsinchu County Stadium4,748 || 4–2
|-style="background:#fcc"
| 7 || December 4 || Pilots || L 80–94 || Terrico White (22) || Sim Bhullar (14) || Terrico White (4) || Hsinchu County Stadium4,062 || 4–3
|-style="background:#fcc"
| 8 || December 10 || @Pilots || L 79–102 || Tien Hao (24) || Sim Bhullar (12) || Tien Hao (6) || Taoyuan Arena3,286 || 4–4
|-style="background:#fcc"
| 9 || December 18 || @Braves || L 98–114 || Terrico White (34) || William Artino (15) || Lee, Tien, Tseng (4) || Taipei Heping Basketball Gymnasium5,568 || 4–5
|-style="background:#fcc"
| 10 || December 24 || @Pilots || L 60–103 || William Artino (20) || William Artino (10) || Kao Kuo-Hao (3) || Taoyuan Arena2,658 || 4–6
|-style="background:#cfc"
| 11 || December 27 || Steelers || W 109–85 || Terrico White (28) || William Artino (22) || Kao Kuo-Hao (5) || Hsinchu County Stadium3,517 || 5–6
|-style="background:#cfc"
| 12 || December 31 || Dreamers || W 102–97 || Kao Kuo-Hao (34) || William Artino (16) || William Artino (7) || Hsinchu County Stadium5,247 || 6–6

|-style="background:#fcc"
| 13 || January 1 || Pilots || L 90–105 || Anthony Bennett (24) || Anthony Bennett (11) || Tien Hao (8) || Hsinchu County Stadium4,574 || 6–7
|-style="background:#fcc"
| 14 || January 7 || Kings || L 85–101 || Terrico White (16) || William Artino (20) || Kao Kuo-Hao (4) || Hsinchu County Stadium4,177 || 6–8
|-style="background:#cfc"
| 15 || January 8 || Braves || W 94–92 || Anthony Bennett (27) || Anthony Bennett (17) || Bennett, Kao (6) || Hsinchu County Stadium5,389 || 7–8
|-style="background:#cfc"
| 16 || January 13 || Dreamers || W 87–80 || Anthony Bennett (28) || Artino, Bennett (15) || Kao Kuo-Hao (10) || Hsinchu County Stadium3,914 || 8–8
|-style="background:#cfc"
| 17 || January 14 || Kings || W 107–106 || Anthony Bennett (35) || Anthony Bennett (12) || Lee Chia-Jui (5) || Hsinchu County Stadium4,694 || 9–8
|-style="background:#fcc"
| 18 || January 28 || @Dreamers || L 99–123 || William Artino (19) || William Artino (10) || Bennett, Tseng (4) || Intercontinental Basketball Stadium3,000 || 9–9
|-style="background:#fcc"
| 19 || January 31 || @Pilots || L 70–88 || Anthony Bennett (30) || Anthony Bennett (17) || Tseng Po-Yu (6) || Taoyuan Arena2,688 || 9–10

|-style="background:#cfc"
| 20 || February 5 || Steelers || W 89–86 || Anthony Bennett (33) || Anthony Bennett (13) || William Artino (7) || Hsinchu County Stadium5,582 || 10–10
|-style="background:#fcc"
| 21 || February 7 || Pilots || L 92–106 || Anthony Bennett (22) || Anthony Bennett (9) || Bennett, Hsiao, White (3) || Hsinchu County Stadium3,560 || 10–11
|-style="background:#fcc"
| 22 || February 12 || @Pilots || L 81–95 || Anthony Bennett (26) || Anthony Bennett (15) || Ifeanyi Eboka (3) || Taoyuan Arena2,367 || 10–12
|-style="background:#fcc"
| 23 || February 19 || Kings || L 85–102 || Anthony Bennett (33) || Anthony Bennett (23) || Anthony Bennett (5) || Hsinchu County Stadium5,597 || 10–13
|-style="background:#fcc"
| 24 || February 21 || @Braves || L 101–131 || Terrico White (25) || Anthony Bennett (8) || Terrico White (8) || Taipei Heping Basketball Gymnasium4,965 || 10–14
|-style="background:#fcc"
| 25 || February 25 || Steelers || L 82–95 || Terrico White (25) || William Artino (15) || Artino, Hsiao (4) || Hsinchu County Stadium8,000 || 10–15
|-style="background:#fcc"
| 26 || February 26 || Dreamers || L 94–100 || Terrico White (28) || William Artino (14) || William Artino (5) || Hsinchu County Stadium4,527 || 10–16

|-style="background:#fcc"
| 27 || March 5 || @Dreamers || L 93–111 || Anthony Bennett (23) || William Artino (17) || Tien Hao (6) || Intercontinental Basketball Stadium3,000 || 10–17
|-style="background:#cfc"
| 28 || March 11 || @Steelers || W 85–76 || William Artino (22) || William Artino (28) || Jeremy Tyler (3) || Fengshan Arena5,127 || 11–17
|-style="background:#fcc"
| 29 || March 19 || @Braves || L 99–112 || William Artino (42) || William Artino (17) || Kao Kuo-Hao (6) || Taipei Heping Basketball Gymnasium6,088 || 11–18
|-
| 30 || March 26 || @Dreamers ||  ||  ||  ||  || Intercontinental Basketball Stadium || 

|-
| 31 || April 2 || @Kings ||  ||  ||  ||  || Xinzhuang Gymnasium || 
|-
| 32 || April 8 || @Steelers ||  ||  ||  ||  || Fengshan Arena || 
|-
| 33 || April 15 || @Dreamers ||  ||  ||  ||  || Intercontinental Basketball Stadium || 
|-
| 34 || April 22 || @Steelers ||  ||  ||  ||  || Fengshan Arena || 
|-
| 35 || April 29 || @Kings ||  ||  ||  ||  || Xinzhuang Gymnasium || 

|-
| 36 || May 1 || Braves ||  ||  ||  ||  || Hsinchu County Stadium || 
|-
| 37 || May 5 || Pilots ||  ||  ||  ||  || Hsinchu County Stadium || 
|-
| 38 || May 7 || @Kings ||  ||  ||  ||  || Xinzhuang Gymnasium || 
|-
| 39 || May 13 || Kings ||  ||  ||  ||  || Hsinchu County Stadium || 
|-
| 40 || May 14 || Braves ||  ||  ||  ||  || Hsinchu County Stadium ||

Player Statistics 
<noinclude>

Regular season

Transactions

Free Agency

Re-signed

Additions

Subtractions

Awards

Players of the Week

References 

Hsinchu JKO Lioneers seasons
Hsinchu JKO Lioneers